Buade may refer to:

Places
 Buade Lake (Normandin River), Quebec, Canada
 Fort de Buade, a French fort in the present U.S. state of Michigan

People
 Antoine de Buade (c. 1567–1626), seigneur de Frontenac, a French soldier and diplomat, grandfather of Louis
 Henri de Buade (1596–1622), French aristocrat and father of Louis
 Louis de Buade de Frontenac (1622–1698), a governor of New France

See also
 Buades